The Parti démocratie chrétienne du Québec fielded twelve candidates in the 2007 Quebec provincial election, none of whom were elected. Information about these candidates may be found on this page.

Candidates

Jean-Lesage: Danielle Benny
Danielle Benny received 116 votes (0.33%), finishing seventh in a field of eight candidates. The winner was Action démocratique du Québec candidate Jean-François Gosselin.

Candidates in Quebec provincial elections
2007